Basic salivary proline-rich protein 1 is a protein that in humans is encoded by the PRB1 gene.

The protein encoded by this gene is a proline-rich salivary protein. This gene and five other genes that also encode salivary proline-rich proteins (PRPs), as well as a gene encoding a lacrimal gland PRP, form a PRP gene cluster in the chromosomal 12p13 region. Alternatively spliced transcript variants encoding distinct isoforms have been described.

References

Further reading

Salivary proline-rich proteins